John Paxton (born 1890) was an English footballer who played for Stoke.

Career
Paxton started his career with his local side West Stanley before joining Stoke in 1910. He played three times for Stoke during the 1910–11 season scoring once which came in a 4–0 win over Stafford Rangers in the Birmingham & District League. He left at the end of the season and joined Chesterfield.

Career statistics

References

English footballers
Stoke City F.C. players
1890 births
Year of death missing
West Stanley F.C. players
Chesterfield F.C. players
Association football forwards
People from South Moor
Footballers from County Durham